Ensieh Khazali or Ensieh Khaz'ali (born 1963 in Qom) is an Iranian politician and Vice President for Women and Family Affairs of the President of Iran in the 13th government.

She is a professor of the Arabic language and literature, and was the President of Al-Zahra University and the dean of the campus of the Razavi University of the Islamic Sciences.

References 

1963 births
Living people
Iranian politicians
21st-century Iranian women politicians
21st-century Iranian politicians